Došek (feminine Došková) is a Czech surname (meaning thatch) and may refer to:

 Kateřina Došková (born 1982), Czech footballer
 Libor Došek (born 1978), Czech footballer
 Lukáš Došek (born 1978), Czech footballer
 Tomáš Došek (born 1978), Czech footballer

Czech-language surnames